PSR may refer to:

Organizations
 Pacific School of Religion, Berkeley, California, US
 Palestinian Center for Policy and Survey Research
 Physicians for Social Responsibility, US

Political parties
 Revolutionary Socialist Party (Portugal) (Partido Socialista Revolucionário)
 Romanian Socialist Party (present-day)

Places
 Abruzzo Airport (IATA airport code), near Pescara, Italy
 Pasir Ris MRT station (MRT station abbreviation), Singapore
 Pioneer Scout Reservation, a Boy Scout camp in Ohio, US

Science and technology
 Pulsar, a kind of star
 Primary radar
 Perimeter surveillance radar
 Posthumous sperm retrieval, from dead men

Computing
 PHP Standard Recommendation
 Predictive state representation of a system
 Problem Steps Recorder, psr.exe, a Microsoft utility
 Panel self-refresh, in Embedded DisplayPort

Law enforcement and military
 US Precision Sniper Rifle
PSR-90, a Pakistani precision sniper rifle

Other uses
 Portuguese Sign Language (ISO 639-3 language code)
 Potential support ratio, in demographics
 Precision scheduled railroading
 Price–sales ratio of stocks
 Primitive Survival Rating, on the Discovery Channel TV series Naked and Afraid
 Principle of sufficient reason